The Catalonia national korfball team is managed by the Federació Catalana de Korfball (FCK), representing Catalonia in korfball international competitions.

Catalonia won the European Bowl in 2005. Their best performance in the World Championships was in 2011, with the 4th place.

Tournament history

Current squad
National team in the 2011 World Championship

 Coach: Tilbert la Haye
 2nd coach: Rosendo Garcia

 Coach: Tilbert la Haye
 2nd coach: Rosendo Garcia

References

External links
 Federació Catalana de Korfball

National korfball teams
korf
Korfball in Catalonia